"Shine" is a song by Australian pop/new wave group Kids in the Kitchen. The song was released in June 1985 as the fourth single from their debut album, Shine (1985). The song peaked at number 40 on the Australian Kent Music Report.

Chris Löfvén directed the video clip, which he calls as "a nightmare assignment". In a 2013 interview he said, "It was an extravaganza that was meant to look like the Russian Revolution, a mini-feature produced on a three-night shoot. It had fireworks and explosions and things being shot from helicopters". Lofven said he "probably spent the $25,000 budget on the first night of shooting."

Track listing 
7" (K9694) 
Side A "Shine"  
Side B "Hard"

12"' (X14190)
Side A1 "Shine" (12" Version) 
Side A2 "Shine 2" (New 7" Version) 
Side B1 "Shine" (Sullivan's String Mix)
Side B2 "Shine" (DJ's Bonus Beat Instrumental)

Charts

References 

1985 songs
1985 singles
Kids in the Kitchen songs
Mushroom Records singles